Rizhao Shanzihe Airport  is an airport serving the city of Rizhao in Shandong Province, China. The airport received approval from the State Council of China and the Central Military Commission in October 2013. It is located in Houcun Town, Donggang District. It was opened on 22 December 2015.

Facilities
The airport has a 2,600-meter runway (class 4C) and a 22,000-square-meter terminal building. It was projected cost 1.34 billion yuan to build.

Airlines and destinations

See also
List of airports in China
List of the busiest airports in China

References

Airports in Shandong
Airports established in 2015
2015 establishments in China
Rizhao